Lhüthiprü Vasa was an Indian politician from Nagaland. He was elected unopposed to the Nagaland Legislative Assembly from Phek (constituency) as an Independent candidate in the first Nagaland Legislative Assembly election during which he served under the P. Shilu Ao regime.

References

Nagaland politicians
1993 deaths
People from Phek district
People from Kohima
Nagaland MLAs 1964–1969
Independent politicians in India
Year of birth missing
Possibly living people